Breaking is an EP by Deathline International, released on November 29, 2019 by COP International and Distortion Productions.

Track listing

Personnel
Adapted from the Lip Service liner notes.

Deathline International
 G.W. Childs – programming
 Steve Lam (as SLam) – programming
 Christian Petke (as Th3Count) – vocals, programming

Additional performers
 John Fryer – programming, producer, engineering
 Angela Goodman – backing vocals
 James Perry – guitar, backing vocals
 Steve Watkins – cymbal

Release history

References

External links 
 
 Breaking at Bandcamp
 Breaking - EP at iTunes

2019 EPs
Deathline International albums
COP International EPs